Evangelos "Vangelis" Sklavos (alternate spelling: Vaggelis) (Greek: Ευάγγελος "Βαγγέλης" Σκλάβος; born 1 December 1977) is a Greek former professional basketball player. He was born in Athens, Greece. At a height of 2.02 m (6'7 ") tall, he played at the small forward and power forward positions.

Professional career
Some of the clubs that Sklavos played with during his professional career included: Panionios, Olympiacos, Valencia, Lokomotiv Rostov, NSB Rieti, and Vanoli Cremona. In 2010, he signed with Panellinios. He moved to AEK Athens in 2011, and then to Pagrati in 2012.

He joined Doxa Lefkadas in 2013.

References

External links
Euroleague.net Profile
FIBA Europe Profile
Eurobasket.com Profile
Italian League Profile 
Spanish League Profile 
Greek League Profile 

1977 births
Living people
AEK B.C. players
Doxa Lefkadas B.C. players
Greek Basket League players
Greek expatriate basketball people in Spain
Greek men's basketball players
Irakleio B.C. players
Koropi B.C. players
Liga ACB players
Milon B.C. players
Nuova AMG Sebastiani Basket Rieti players
Olympiacos B.C. players
Pagrati B.C. players
Panellinios B.C. players
Panionios B.C. players
PBC Lokomotiv-Kuban players
Power forwards (basketball)
Small forwards
Valencia Basket players
Vanoli Cremona players
Basketball players from Athens
Greek expatriate basketball people in Italy